Hasan Beyglu (also Romanized as Ḩasan Beyglū) is a village in Minjavan-e Gharbi Rural District, Minjavan District, Khoda Afarin County, East Azerbaijan Province, Iran. At the 2006 census, its population was 80, in 16 families.

References 

Populated places in Khoda Afarin County